Paris Volley is a professional men's volleyball club based in Paris, France. They compete in the top flight of French volleyball, Ligue A. The club was founded in 1998 from the merger of the volleyball section of Paris Université Club (PUC) and Paris Saint-Germain Racing Volley.

Honours

Domestic
 French Championship
Winners (9): 1999–2000, 2000–01, 2001–02, 2002–03, 2005–06, 2006–07, 2007–08, 2008–09, 2015–16

 French Cup
Winners (4): 1998–99, 1999–2000, 2001–01, 2003–04

 French SuperCup
Winners (3): 2004–05, 2006–07, 2013–14

International
 CEV Champions League
Winners (1): 2000–01

 CEV Cup
Winners (2): 1999–2000, 2013–14

Current squad

Kit history

References

External links
 Official website 
 Team profile at Volleybox.net

French volleyball clubs
Sports clubs in Paris
Volleyball in Paris
Volleyball clubs established in 1998
1998 establishments in France